The Bull & Gate is a Grade II listed public house at 389 Kentish Town Road, Kentish Town, London.

It was built in 1871.

The pub had a long history as music venue, with bands such as Coldplay, Blur and Nirvana playing there towards the start of their careers. It ceased operations as a venue in 2013, after being sold by previous owners to the Young's pub chain.

References

Grade II listed pubs in London
Kentish Town
Pubs in the London Borough of Camden
Grade II listed buildings in the London Borough of Camden
Former music venues in London
Underground punk scene in the United Kingdom